Baghak-e Jonubi (also Romanized as Bāghak-e Jonūbī) is a village in Baghak Rural District, in the Central District of Tangestan County, Bushehr Province, Iran. At the 2011 census, its population was 1,210 in 320 families.

In 2010 Baghak-e Jonubi was created by the former villages that came together:
Bagh-e Salem-e Jonubi (باغ سالم جنوبی) - Bagh-e Salem-e Shomali (باغ سالم شمالی) - Ali Shams ol Din (عالی شمس الدین) - Rameh Char (رمه چر) - Tokhmari (تخماری) - Deh-e Now (ده نو) - Deh Kohneh (ده کهنه) - Shamshiri (شمشیری) - Mal Barik (مل باریک) - Jovey (جوی).
This village at the 2006 census, had a population of 1,128 in 253 families.

References 

Populated places in Tangestan County